Creed Live is the first concert film by the American rock band Creed, recorded on September 25, 2009, in Houston and released on December 8, 2009. The performance broke the world record for the most cameras (239) used at a live music event and was available for viewing for free on Rockpit and MyContent. All of the band's hits, including the new single "Overcome", were performed. It also features usage of the "bullet time" technology, popularized by the 1999 film The Matrix. The DVD is dedicated to the United States military troops fighting overseas.

The DVD also includes a documentary film about the band's 2009 reunion and a photo gallery. A limited three-disc deluxe edition was said to be available in early 2010, but details have yet to surface, as of 2020.

Track listing

Certifications

Personnel
Creed
Scott Stapp – lead vocals
Mark Tremonti – lead guitar, backing vocals
Brian Marshall – bass
Scott Phillips – drums

Additional musicians
Eric Friedman – rhythm guitar, backing vocals, mandolin on "Are You Ready?"

References

Live video albums
2009 video albums
Creed (band) video albums
2009 live albums